Brătianu is a family of Romanian politicians, founders of the National Liberal Party (PNL). They are the following:
 Dincă Brătianu (1768–1844), Romanian nobleman 
 Ion Brătianu (1821–1891), PNL president, 1875–1891; Interior Minister, 1867, 1867–1868, 1877–1878, 1878–1879, 1882, 1884–1887; President of the Assembly of Deputies, 1868–1869; Prime Minister, 1876–1888, with a brief interruption in 1881
 Dimitrie Brătianu (1818–1892), PLD president, 1885–1890; PNL president, 1891–1892; Foreign Affairs Minister, 1859; Interior Minister, 1860; Prime Minister and Foreign Affairs Minister, 1881; President of the Assembly of Deputies, 1881–1882
 Elisa Brătianu (née Princess Elisa Știrbei, daughter of Prince  Alexandru B. Știrbei) (1870–1957) central figure in Romanian politics and cultural preservation from 1907 to 1948. Was a participant in the Inter-Allied Women's Conference presentation to the League of Nations in 1919.
 Ion I. C. Brătianu (1864–1927), PNL president, 1909–1927; Interior Minister, 1907–1909, 1910, 1923–1926; Foreign Affairs Minister, 1916–1918, 1918–1919, 1927; Prime Minister, 1908–1910, 1914–1918, 1918–1919, 1922–1926, 1927
 Dinu Brătianu (1866–1950), PNL president, 1934–1947; died at Sighet Prison
 Vintilă Brătianu (1867–1930), PNL president, 1927–1930; Prime Minister, 1927–1928
 Constantin C. (Bebe) Brătianu (1887–1956), PNL General Secretary, 1938–1947
 Gheorghe I. Brătianu (1898–1953), president of the National Liberal Party-Brătianu, 1930–1938; died at Sighet Prison
  (1914–1994), president of the Liberal Party 1993, 1993–1994

References